The antiquities trade is the exchange of antiquities and archaeological artifacts from around the world. This trade may be illicit or completely legal. The legal antiquities trade abides by national regulations, allowing for extraction of artifacts for scientific study whilst maintaining archaeological and anthropological context. The illicit antiquities trade involves non-scientific extraction that ignores the archaeological and anthropological context from the artifacts.

Legal trade
The legal trade in antiquities abide by the laws of the countries in which the artifacts originate. These laws establish how the antiquities may be extracted from the ground and the legal process in which artifacts may leave the country. In many countries excavations and exports were prohibited without official licenses already in the 19th century, as for example in the Ottoman Empire. According to the laws of the countries of origin, there can't be a legal trade with archaeological artifact without official papers. However, most national laws still overturn these regulations.

Illicit trade

Illicit or illegal antiquities are those found in illegal or unregulated excavations, and traded covertly. The black market trade of illicit antiquities is supplied by looting and art theft. Artifacts are often those that have been discovered and unearthed at archeological digs and then transported internationally through a middleman to often unsuspecting collectors, museums, antique dealers, and auction houses. The antiquities trade is much more careful in recent years about establishing the provenance of cultural artifacts. Some estimates put annual turnover in billions of US dollars.

The true extent of the trade is unknown as incidents of looting are underreported. To such a degree that it is not unheard of for stolen pieces to be found in auction houses before they have been noticed as missing from their original home.

It is believed by many archaeologists and cultural heritage lawyers that the demand created by circulation, marketing, and collectorship of ancient artifacts causes the continuous looting and destruction of archaeological sites around the world. Archaeological artifacts are internationally protected by the Hague Convention for the Protection of Cultural Property in the Event of Armed Conflict and international trade in cultural property of dubious provenance is restricted by the UNESCO Convention (1970) on the Means of Prohibiting and Preventing the Illicit Import, Export and Transfer of Ownership of Cultural Property. After years of resistance, the United States played a major role in drafting and promoting the 1970 Convention.

Examples of looting of archaeological sites for the black market:
Archaeological looting in Iraq
Archaeological looting in Romania
Maya stelae looting

Response 
Recent trends reveal a large push to repatriate artifacts illicitly extracted and traded on the international market. Such artifacts include those held by museums like the Getty Museum and the Metropolitan Museum of Art. In order to solve the phenomenon of looting, aerial surveillance - the effectiveness of which depends on the capability to perform systematic prospections - is increasingly being used.  Nevertheless, it is impractical in several countries due to military activity, political restrictions, and/or huge areas and difficult environmental settings (desert, rain forest, etc..). In these contexts, space technology could offer a suitable chance as in the case of Peru. In this country an Italian scientific mission directed by Nicola Masini, since 2008 have been using very high resolution satellite data to observe and monitor the phenomenon of huaqueros (archaeological looting) in some archaeological areas in Southern and Northern Peru. The U.S. Government Accountability Office issued a report describing some of the United States’ cultural property protection efforts.

See also 
 Antiquities Coalition

References

Further reading
 Brodie, Neil, ed. 2006. Archaeology, Cultural Heritage, and the Antiquities Trade. Gainesville: Univ. Press of Florida.
 Diaz-Andreu, Margarita. 2007. A World History of Nineteenth-Century Archaeology: Nationalism, Colonialism, and the Past. New York: Oxford Univ. Press.
 La Follette, Laetitia, ed. 2013. Negotiating culture: Heritage, Ownership, and Intellectual Property. Boston: Univ. of Massachusetts Press.
 Kila, Joris D., and James A. Zeidler, eds. 2013. Cultural Heritage in the Crosshairs: Protecting Cultural Property during Conflict. Boston: E. J. Brill.
 Mackenzie, Simon, and Penny Green, eds. 2009. Criminology and Archaeology: Studies in Looted Antiquities. Portland, OR: Hart.
 Merryman, John H. 2009. Thinking about the Elgin Marbles: Critical Essays on Cultural Property, Art and Law. Alphen aan den Rijn, The Netherlands: Kluwer Law International.
 Miles, Margaret M. 2010. Art as Plunder: The Ancient Origins of Debate about Cultural Property. Cambridge, UK: Cambridge Univ. Press.
 Renfrew, Colin. 2009. Loot, Legitimacy, and Ownership: The Ethical Crisis in Archaeology. London: Duckworth.
 Soderland, Hilary A. and Ian A. Lilley. 2015. "The Fusion of Law and Ethics in Cultural Heritage Management: The 21st Century Confronts Archaeology." Journal of Field Archaeology 40: 508-522.
 Vrdoljak, Ana Filipa. 2006. International Law, Museums and the Return of Cultural Objects. Cambridge, UK: Cambridge Univ. Press.

External links

 US Department of State, Bureau of Education and Cultural Affairs, Cultural Heritage Center.
 UNESCO World Heritage at the Switzerland Federal Office of Culture.
 Convention on the Protection of the Underwater Cultural Heritage 2001

Ancient art
Art and cultural repatriation
Trade by commodity